Chettinad Academy of Research And Education (CARE) is a private and deemed university is located in Chennai. Established in 2005, it is a part of the Chettinad Group.

Chettinad Academy of Research and Education 
Chettinad Academy of Research and Education (Deemed to be a University):
Chettinad Hospital & Research Institute, Chettinad Health City
Chettinad College of Nursing
Chettinad School of Architecture
Chettinad College of Law
Chettinad school of pharmaceutical sciences

References 

Universities in Chennai
Educational institutions established in 2005
2005 establishments in Tamil Nadu